San Antonio Tepetlapa  is a town and municipality in Oaxaca in south-western Mexico. The municipality covers an area of 65.07 km². 
It is located in the Jamiltepec District in the west of the Costa Region.

As of 2005, the municipality had a total population of 3873.

References

Municipalities of Oaxaca